American Seedsman was an American agricultural magazine founded in 1919. It was based at 332 South LaSalle Street in Chicago, Illinois, and was published monthly on the fifteenth day of the monthly. In 1920, it had a print circulation of around three thousand. It featured articles on the growing and harvesting of seeds.

In 1920, its former editor, Newton C. Evans, became managing editor, with John J. Garland succeeding him as editor. Garland joined the publication from Holmes–Letherman Seed Company in Canton, Ohio, for whom he was treasurer.

References 

Companies based in Chicago
Defunct magazines published in the United States
20th-century publications
1919 establishments in Illinois